Conomitra is the scientific name of two genera of organisms and may refer to:

Conomitra (gastropod), a genus of snails in the family Volutomitridae
Conomitra (plant), a genus of plants in the family Apocynaceae